Texts corresponding with the bible are often used to corroborate history surrounding the events mentioned

See also
 Ludlul bēl nēmeqi

Bibliography
 Bill T. Arnold and Bryan E. Beyer: Readings from the Ancient Near East (2002)
 William W. Hallo & K. Lawson Younger: The Context of Scripture (2003)
 Miriam Lichtheim: Ancient Egyptian Literature (1971-1980)
 Victor H. Matthews & Don C. Benjamin: Old Testament Parallels: Laws and Stories from the Ancient Near East (2006)
 James B. Pritchard: Ancient Near East Texts Relating to the Old Testament (1969)
Kenton L. Sparks: Ancient Texts for the Study of the Hebrew Bible (2005)

References

Bible history